The Wandfluehorn is a mountain of the Swiss Pennine Alps, located between Les Haudères and Zermatt in the canton of Valais. It lies south of the Dent Blanche.

While the western side is flat and covered by the Ferpècle Glacier, the eastern side consists of a 600 metres cliff named Wandflue.

References

External links
 Wandfluehorn on Hikr

Mountains of the Alps
Alpine three-thousanders
Mountains of Valais
Mountains of Switzerland